Mark Norris may refer to:

 Mark Norris (Canadian politician) (born 1962), Alberta politician
 Mark Norris (judge) (born 1955), United States federal judge and former Tennessee state senator 
 Mark Norris (technology writer), British consultant and writer